Alison M. Bell is an American ecologist who studies animal behaviour at the University of Illinois at Urbana–Champaign. She has focused on the evolution of and mechanisms that underpin animal personality. In 2020, she was elected a Fellow of the American Association for the Advancement of Science.

Early life and education 
Bell was an undergraduate student at the University of Chicago, where she studied the history and philosophy of science. She moved to the University of California, Davis for her graduate studies, where she earned a doctorate in population biology. Her doctoral research considered the three-spined stickleback, a species with which she became an expert. Bell was a postdoctoral scholar at the University of Glasgow, before joining the University of California, Davis.

Research and career 
Bell was the 2012 recipient of the Young Investigator Award from the Animal Behavior Society. Her research considers animal behavioural syndromes and their impacts. The molecular mechanisms that underpin how animals coordinate their behaviour is still unclear. In particular, Bell has studied why individual three-spined sticklebacks behave differently to one another.

She used sticklebacks as a test species to understand the changes in brain activity associated with being a parent. Bell studied male sticklebacks, which provide care to their eggs and build their nests. Bell finds the interactions between male sticklebacks and their young especially interesting because they are not the typical changes associated with female sticklebacks gestating; they occur exogenously. Bell studied the gene expression of male sticklebacks before and after becoming fathers, at three points of the hatching process. She found an overlap between the genes associated with parental care in stickleback fathers and those of maternal mice. In 2020, Bell was elected a Fellow of the American Association for the Advancement of Science.

Selected publications

References 

Living people
Year of birth missing (living people)
American ecologists
Women ecologists